Acleris maculidorsana, the stained-back leafroller moth, is a species of moth of the family Tortricidae. It is found in North America, where it has been recorded from Arkansas, Florida, Georgia, Kentucky, Maine, Maryland, Massachusetts, Michigan, Mississippi, New Jersey, North Carolina, Ohio, Ontario, Pennsylvania, South Carolina, Tennessee, Virginia and Wisconsin.

The wingspan is 15–18 mm. Adults are similar to Acleris inana and Acleris busckana, but are much grayer species than the former. From busckana it differs in having a dark lunate patch above the inner margin near the base of the wing, which is entirely pale gray. Adults have been recorded on wing nearly year round.

The larvae feed on Chamaedaphne calyculata, Hypericum (including Hypericum perforatum), Kalmia and Vaccinium species.

References

Moths described in 1864
maculidorsana
Moths of North America